Anna Costanza Baldry (16 May 1970 – 9 March 2019) was an Italian social psychologist and criminologist. She was a professor at Università degli Studi della Campania Luigi Vanvitelli. An expert on issues related to violence against women and children, Baldry consulted with such organizations as the United Nations and NATO. For her contributions to society, she was awarded the Order of Merit of the Italian Republic.

Biography 
Baldry was born in London on 16 May 1970. She attended Sapienza University of Rome, earning an undergraduate degree in psychology in 1994 and a PhD in social psychology in 1999. She studied criminology at the University of Cambridge, earning a master's degree in 1996 and a PhD in 2001, under the supervision of David Farrington. From 2003 to 2004, she completed a post-doctoral fellowship at the Free University of Amsterdam, having been awarded funding from Marie Skłodowska-Curie Actions. From 2005, she taught courses in psychology and criminology at Università degli Studi della Campania Luigi Vanvitelli. She also taught victimology at Catholic University of Milan.

Baldry conducted research and consulted on topics related to aggression and relationships, including child and adolescent bullying, cyberbullying, and gender-based violence. She led a number of prevention and intervention projects, including the development of Threat Assessment of Bullying Behaviors among Youngsters (TABBY), a bullying intervention program implemented in eight countries, and the validation of the Spousal Assault Risk Assessment (SARA) protocol in Italy. She also provided training on violence to law enforcement, social workers, and other service providers, and served as an expert consultant to such organization as the United Nations, OSCE and NATO.

In 2015, she was awarded the Order of Merit of the Italian Republic by President Sergio Mattarella, the country's highest honour.

Baldry died on 9 March 2019.

Selected works

References 

1970 births
2019 deaths
Social psychologists
Italian women psychologists
Italian women criminologists
Italian psychologists
Italian criminologists
Italian women academics
Recipients of the Order of Merit of the Italian Republic
Sapienza University of Rome alumni
Alumni of the University of Cambridge
Academic staff of the Università degli Studi della Campania Luigi Vanvitelli